Asmik-kun World 2 (アスミッくん ワールド 2 Asumikkun Wārudo 2) is a Game Boy video game by Asmik, copyrighted in 1991.Unlike its predecessor, Boomer's Adventure in ASMIK World (Teke! Teke! Asmik-kun World), this game was never released outside Japan. Like its predecessor, the game is an excellent example of the trap-em-up genre, which also includes games like Heiankyo Alien and Space Panic.

In the game, Asmik-kun has to build a "road" from the entrance to the exit in each level. An enemy has come to kidnap the children on a certain world and the "roads" are intended for the children to be rescued and escorted safely back home.

References

1991 video games
Asmik Ace Entertainment games
Dinosaurs in video games
Game Boy-only games
Japan-exclusive video games
Maze games
Video games developed in Japan
Video game sequels
Game Boy games